Angels from Hell is a 1968 action film directed by Bruce Kessler and starring Tom Stern and Arlene Martel. It was the first film produced by Joe Solomon's Fanfare Films, a firm Solomon had created with the profits from three previous biker films.  The film was shot in Bakersfield, California. The screenplay was written by Jerome Wish, and the film used music by The Peanut Butter Conspiracy and The Lollipop Shoppe. Sonny Barger, president of the Oakland, California chapter of the Hells Angels, is credited as story consultant

Plot
A former motorcycle club leader, Mike (Tom Stern), returns home from Vietnam to resume his life and form a new motorcycle club. Using all his gathered experience as a hero from the war, he tries to unite all the existing motorcycle clubs in California, and put together a brand new, super outlaw club. They beat a road police officer who wants to give them a parking ticket. Although the sheriff tries to calm everybody down, things are not going down well. Very soon, Mike faces big trouble when Speed (Stephen Oliver), one of his gang members, is stopped on fake possession charges and murdered on retaliation. The trouble intensifies when an all-out cop against biker war breaks out.

Cast 
Tom Stern as Mike
Ted Markland as Smiley
Jack Starrett as Bingham
Arlene Martel as Ginger
Paul Bertoya as Nutty Norman
Jimmy Murphy as Tiny Tim
Sandra Bettin (credited as Saundra Gayle)
Bob Harris as Baney
Luana Talltree as Angry Annie
Susanne Walters as Saundra Gayle
Rod Wilmoth as Police Officer
Stephen Oliver as Speed
Pepper Martin as Dennis
Jay York as George
Ginger Snapp as Buff
Lori Hay as Go Go Dancer
Lee Stanley as Reynolds
Doug Hume as Crowley
Jim Reynolds as Durkens
Steven Rogers as Dude
Susan Holloway as Jennifer
Judith Garwood as Louise
Tony Rush as Hippoe Child
Maureen Heard as Hippie Girl
Barry Feinstein as The Prophet
Dodie Warren as Hippie Girl's Mother
Wally Berns as Hippie Girl's Father
Cynthia McAdams as Pearl
Bud Ekins as The Scrambler
The Madcaps Of Bakersfield

See also
List of American films of 1968

References

External links

1968 films
American action drama films
1960s English-language films
1960s action films
Outlaw biker films
Films scored by Stu Phillips
Films directed by Bruce Kessler
American International Pictures films
1960s American films